Vitrified clay pipe (VCP) is pipe made from a blend of clay and shale that has been subjected to high temperature to achieve vitrification,  which results in a hard, inert ceramic.

VCP is commonly used in gravity sewer collection mains because of its long life and resistance to almost all domestic and industrial sewage, particularly the sulfuric acid that is generated by hydrogen sulfide, a common component of sewage. Only hydrofluoric acid and highly concentrated caustic wastes are known to attack VCP. Such wastes would not be permitted to be discharged into a municipal sewage collection system without adequate pretreatment.

There are three main types of VCP produced in the U.S.:  Bell & Spigot Pipe (with factory-applied compression joints), Band-Seal pipe (with rubber compression couplings) and NO-DIG(R) Pipe (for trenchless installation with an elastomeric gasket and stainless steel collar for a low-profile compression joint).  All VCP manufactured in the U.S. must comply with ASTM C425 to provide a flexible leak-free joint.

Clay pipe has been in-use in sanitary sewer systems for at least 5,000 years

Production
VCP pipe is made by forming clay then heating it to 2000 degrees Fahrenheit (1100 degrees Celsius). The pipe is then vitrified. In some areas the pipe is then glazed to ensure that it will be water-tight.

Benefits
VCP products use clay as a major component in its production, making its raw materials environmentally friendly. The manufacturing process has been fine-tuned for centuries and was designed to be fiscally responsible which had the added benefit of being environmentally responsible. But the primary benefit (both environmental and fiscal) of using VCP in sanitary sewers is its long service life.

As Sanitary Sewer Overflows (SSOs) have become an area of concern for the US EPA and thus a very large potential liability for municipalities, cleaning sewers for condition assessment and maintenance has become a critical factor in system design.  Flexible thermoplastic pipe limits the tools available for this cleaning as they are more easily damaged.  VCP allows for aggressive cleaning methods which prolongs the service life of a sewer line and frequently eliminates the need for expensive dig-ups.

Further, VCP's resistance to a wide variety of acids besides hydrofluoric acid make it a long lasting choice for use in underground sewers.

References 

Sewerage
Building materials